There were five special elections to the United States House of Representatives in 2009 during the 111th United States Congress.

One seat has switched parties, from Republican to Democratic, as the result of a special election.

Summary 

Elections are listed by date and district.

|-
!  
| Kirsten Gillibrand
| 
| 2006
|  | Incumbent resigned January 26, 2009 to become U.S. senator.New member elected March 31, 2009.Democratic hold.
| nowrap | 

|-
! 
| Rahm Emanuel
| 
| 2002
|  | Incumbent resigned January 2, 2009 to become White House Chief of Staff.New member elected April 4, 2009.Democratic hold.
| nowrap | 

|-
! 
| Hilda Solis
| 
| 2000
|  | Incumbent resigned February 24, 2009, to become U.S. Secretary of Labor.New member elected July 14, 2009.Democratic hold.
| nowrap | 

|-
! 
| Ellen Tauscher
| 
| 1996
|  | Incumbent resigned June 26, 2009, to become U.S. Under Secretary of State for Arms Control and International Security Affairs.New member elected November 3, 2009.Democratic hold.
| nowrap | 

|-
! 
| John M. McHugh
| 
| 1992
|  | Incumbent resigned September 21, 2009, to become U.S. Secretary of the Army.New member elected November 3, 2009.Democratic gain.
| nowrap | 

|}

New York's 20th congressional district 

On January 26, 2009, Democrat Kirsten Gillibrand resigned when appointed to fill Hillary Clinton's U.S. Senate seat. Scott Murphy, a fellow Democrat, won the election held March 31, 2009, defeating Republican Jim Tedisco by fewer than 700 votes. Because of the slim margin, Tedisco did not concede the race until more than three weeks later, when overseas ballots had been counted.

Illinois's 5th congressional district 

On January 2, 2009, Democrat Rahm Emanuel resigned one day before the end of the previous Congress after being named White House Chief of Staff. Democrat Michael Quigley won the election April 7, 2009 election to replace him, handily defeating Republican Rosanna Pulido with better than a two-to-one share of the vote.

California's 32nd congressional district 

On February 24, 2009, Democrat Hilda Solis resigned to become United States Secretary of Labor. Judy Chu, also a Democrat, won the election, defeating Republican Betty Chu by a wide margin.

California's 10th congressional district 

On June 26, 2009, Democrat Ellen Tauscher resigned to become Undersecretary of State for Arms Control and International Security. Democrat John Garamendi held the seat for the Democrats on November 3, 2009, defeating Republican David Harmer.

New York's 23rd congressional district 

On September 21, 2009, Republican John M. McHugh resigned to become United States Secretary of the Army. On November 3, 2009, Democrat Bill Owens defeated Conservative Doug Hoffman and Republican Dede Scozzafava in a race that garnered considerable press attention. Days before the election, Scozzafava dropped out of the race, then endorsed Owens, the Democrat.

See also 
 List of special elections to the United States Senate
 List of special elections to the United States House of Representatives
 2010 United States Senate elections

References 

 
2009